Tonnage is a measure of the cargo-carrying capacity of a ship, and is commonly used to assess fees on commercial shipping. The term derives from the taxation paid on tuns or casks of wine. In modern maritime usage, "tonnage" specifically refers to a calculation of the volume or cargo volume of a ship. Although tonnage (volume) should not be confused with displacement (the actual weight of the vessel), the long ton (or imperial ton) of 2,240 lb is derived from the fact that a "tun" of wine typically weighed that much.

Current maritime units 
Tonnage measurements are governed by an IMO Convention (International Convention on Tonnage Measurement of Ships, 1969 (London-Rules)), which initially applied to all ships built after July 1982, and to older ships from July 1994. A commonly defined measurement system is important, since a ship's registration fee, harbour dues, safety and manning rules, and the like may be based on its gross tonnage (GT) or net tonnage (NT).

Gross tonnage

Gross tonnage (GT) is a function of the volume of all of a ship's enclosed spaces (from keel to funnel) measured to the outside of the hull framing. The numerical value for a ship's GT is always smaller than the numerical values of gross register tonnage (GRT). Gross tonnage is therefore a kind of capacity-derived index that is used to rank a ship for purposes of determining manning, safety, and other statutory requirements and is expressed simply as GT, which is a unitless entity, even though it derives from the volumetric capacity in cubic metres.

Net tonnage

Net tonnage (NT) is based on a calculation of the volume of all cargo spaces of the ship. It indicates a vessel's earning space and is a function of the moulded volume of all cargo spaces of the ship.

Panama Canal/UMS

The Panama Canal/Universal Measurement System (PC/UMS) is based on net tonnage modified for Panama Canal purposes.

Suez Canal Net Tonnage

The Suez Canal Net Tonnage (SCNT) is derived with a number of modifications from the former net register tonnage of the Moorsom System and was established by the International Commission of Constantinople in its Protocol of 18 December 1873. It is still in use, as amended by the Rules of Navigation of the Suez Canal Authority and is registered in the Suez Canal Tonnage Certificate.

Thames measurement tonnage

Thames measurement tonnage (TM) is another volumetric system, generally used for small vessels such as yachts; it uses a formula based on the vessel's length and beam.

Historical maritime units

Traditional casks

This suggests that the unit of weight measurement, the long ton (1,016 kg or 2,240 lb), and tonnage share the same etymology. Similar systems were enacted throughout Europe, with the standard wine casks of various local systems serving simultaneously as units of mass, volume, and shipping capacity. In specific historical contexts such as the capacity of galleons, these unitssuch as the Spanish and Portuguese are sometimes simply discussed in English as tons despite being larger or smaller at times than their English equivalent.

The confusion between weight-based termsdeadweight and displacementstems from these common sources and the eventual decision to assess dues based on a ship's deadweight rather than counting the tuns of wine. In 1720, the Builder's Old Measurement Rule was adopted in England to estimate deadweight from the length of keel and maximum breadth or beam of a ship. This overly simplistic system was replaced by the Moorsom System in 1854 to calculate internal volume rather than weight. This system evolved into the current set of internationally accepted rules and regulations. Harbor dues are based on tonnage. In order to prevent steamships operating at a disadvantage, various tonnage calculations were established to minimize the disadvantage presented by the extra space requirements of steamships. Rather than charging by length, displacement, or the like, charges were calculated based on the viable cargo space. As commercial cargo sailing ships are now largely extinct, gross tonnage is becoming the universal method of calculating ships' dues, and is also a more straightforward and transparent method of assessment.

Gross register tonnage

The definition and calculation of the internal volume is complex; for instance, a ship's hold may be assessed for bulk grain (accounting for all the air space in the hold) or for bales (omitting the spaces into which bulk, but not baled cargo, would spill). Gross register tonnage was replaced by gross tonnage in 1982 under the Tonnage Measurement convention of 1969, with all ships measured in GRT either scrapped or re-measured in GT by 1994.

Net register tonnage

Net register tonnage (NRT) is the volume of cargo the vessel can carry—that is, the gross register tonnage less the volume of spaces that do not hold cargo (e.g., engine compartment, helm station, and crew spaces, again with differences depending on which port or country does the calculations). It represents the volume of the ship available for transporting freight or passengers. It was replaced by net tonnage in 1994, under the Tonnage Measurement convention of 1969.

See also 

 Builder's Old Measurement
 Displacement (ship)
 List of largest ships by gross tonnage
 Long ton
 Short ton
 Ton
 Tonne (or 'metric ton')

Notes

References
 The Oxford Companion To Ships & The Sea, by I. C. B. Dear and Peter Kemp. Oxford University Press, 1979. 
 Ship Design and Construction, Volume II; Thomas Lamb, Editor. Society of Naval Architects and Marine Engineers, 2004. 

Volume
Mass
Nautical terminology
Ship measurements